Club de Futbol Montañesa is a Spanish football team based in Barcelona in the district of Nou Barris, in the autonomous community of Catalonia. Founded in 1927, it plays in the Primera Catalana – Group 1, holding home games at Camp Municipal de Nou Barris, with a capacity of 2,500 seats.

Season to season

8 seasons in Tercera División

Current squad

External links
Official website 
Futbolme team profile 

Football clubs in Catalonia
Football clubs in Barcelona
Association football clubs established in 1927
1927 establishments in Spain